Jean de Cambefort ( – 4 May 1661) was a French Baroque singer and composer of ballets and liturgical music. He died in Paris, France. He is now mostly remembered for composing six  airs (recits) for the Ballet de la Nuit, performed in 1653.

Works 
 Ballet de la Nuit, 1653;
 Récit du temps et des quatre saisons, v Ballet du Temps (LWV 1), 1654;
 Airs de cour, Parigi, 1651;
 II. livre d’airs, Parigi, 1655;
 17 arias, from 1651 and 1655.

Notes

Bibliography 
 Burden, Michael; Thorp, Jennifer (2009; revised 2010). Ballet de la Nuit: Rothschild B1/16/6. Hillsdale, New York: Pendragon Press. . Product page for the revised edition at Pendragon.
 McGowan, Margaret M. (2001). "Cambefort, Jean de" in The New Grove Dictionary of Music and Musicians, 2nd edition, edited by Stanley Sadie. London: Macmillan.  (hardcover).  (eBook).
 Prunières, Henry (1912). "Jean de Cambefort, surintendant de la musique du roi, d'après des documents inédits", L'Année musicale, pp. 205–226.

External links 

French Baroque composers
French male classical composers
1605 births
1661 deaths
Musicians from Paris
17th-century male musicians